Lavasanat District is in Shemiranat County, Tehran province, Iran. The administrative center of the district is Lavasan. At the 2006 National Census, its population was 22,289 in 6,615 households. The following census in 2011 counted 25,376 people in 8,196 households. At the latest census in 2016, the district had 29,860 inhabitants in 10,138 households.

During the Qajar era and early 20th century Lavasanat was the transit way between northern slopes of Elburz and Tehran with Great Lavasan (Lavasan Bozorg), Ammameh , Afjeh and Najarkala known as the most famous towns of Lavasanat.

The natives of the Lavasanat district are of Caspian origin. The local dialect or "vernacular" spoken by its natives is a mix of Persian and Caspian. In the village of Ira (as well as Veskara), this vernacular approaches Mazandarani.

References

Sources 
 

Shemiranat County

Districts of Tehran Province

Populated places in Tehran Province

Populated places in Shemiranat County